Biryuk, sometimes transliterated as Biriuk is an East Slavic surname derived from a nickname literally meaning "lone wolf".

Galina Biryuk, student of Nikolay Bogolyubov, Soviet mathematician and physicist
Iryna Biryuk, Ukrainian basketball player, member of the Ukraine women's national basketball team
Lev Biryuk (b. 1946), Ukrainian politician
Lyubov Biryuk, Andrei Chikatilo's murder victim
Natalia Biryuk, Ukrainian featherweight boxer participating in the 2011 Women's European Amateur Boxing Championships
Tamara Biryuk, Ukrainian high jumper participating in the 2012 World Junior Championships in Athletics – Women's high jump

See also